"Electro Movimiento" is  the second single  by Puerto Rican hip hop band Calle 13 from their third studio album Los de Atrás Vienen Conmigo and was released on September 23, 2008 by Sony BMG.

Background
The song is freestyle influenced, similar to pop-dance music of the 1980s. It is also R&B influenced, especially in the chorus. In the lyrics, the song makes several pop culture references, ones such as traveling back to the 1980s to the time when Madonna was a virgin and John Travolta was spinning his dance moves, going back to a decade of stability and a generation of dancers that would have been electrified by Calle 13. It also calls dancers to mix drugs with alcohol, and to act like rock stars Axl Rose and Slash, when Residente shouts: "Welcome to the Jungle, Let's Get Ready to Rumble!"

Track listing
US iTunes Store Digital Download
 "Electro Movimiento" (3:16)

Charts

References

2009 singles
Calle 13 (band) songs
Sony BMG Norte singles
2009 songs
Songs about dancing
LGBT-related songs
Songs written by Residente